Waterman House may refer to:

in the United Kingdom
Waterman House, London

in the United States
Waterman-Archer House, Fayetteville, Arkansas, listed on the National Register of Historic Places (NRHP)
Long-Waterman House, San Diego, California, NRHP-listed in San Diego County
Ball-Waterman House, Davenport, Iowa, NRHP-listed
Wallace W. Waterman Sod House, Big Springs, Nebraska, NRHP-listed
Waterman-Gramps House, Nelliston, New York, NRHP-listed
William Waterman House, Coventry, Rhode Island, NRHP-listed
Waterman-Winsor Farm, Smithfield, Rhode Island, NRHP-listed
John Waterman Arnold House, Warwick, Rhode Island, NRHP-listed
S.H. Waterman House, Oshkosh, WI, NRHP-listed in Winnebago County

See also
Waterman Tavern, Coventry, Rhode Island, NRHP-listed
John Waterman Arnold House, Warwick, Rhode Island, NRHP-listed
John and Mary Waterman Jarves House, Sandwich, Massachusetts, NRHP-listed
Waterman Place-Kingsbury Place-Washington Terrace Historic District, St. Louis, Missouri, NRHP-listed
Waterman Service Building, Cleveland, Ohio, NRHP-listed
Waterman Covered Bridge, Johnson, Vermont, NRHP-listed
Waterman (surname)
Waterman (disambiguation)